Małgorzata Stryjska (born 3 August 1953 in Poznań) is a Polish politician. She was elected to the Sejm on 25 September 2005, getting 12 791 votes in 39 Poznań district, running as a candidate on the Law and Justice list.

She was also a member of Sejm 2001-2005.

See also
Members of Polish Sejm 2005-2007

External links
Małgorzata Stryjska - parliamentary page - includes declarations of interest, voting record, and transcripts of speeches.

1953 births
Living people
Politicians from Poznań
Members of the Polish Sejm 2005–2007
Members of the Polish Sejm 2001–2005
Women members of the Sejm of the Republic of Poland
Law and Justice politicians
21st-century Polish women politicians